David Edward Theomin (né David Ezekiel Benjamin, 25 April 1852 – 15 July 1933) was a notable New Zealand merchant, philanthropist and collector. He was born in Bristol, England, in 1852. One of his two children was Dorothy Michaelis Theomin.

References

1852 births
1933 deaths
New Zealand philanthropists
New Zealand people of German-Jewish descent
New Zealand Jews
New Zealand businesspeople
English emigrants to New Zealand
Hallenstein family
Burials at Dunedin Southern Cemetery